Five Points was an unincorporated community in Wetzel County, West Virginia.

References 

Unincorporated communities in West Virginia
Unincorporated communities in Wetzel County, West Virginia